"Baby" is a song by British rapper Aitch and American singer Ashanti. The song was released on 10 March 2022 by Capitol Records, as the lead single from his debut album, Close to Home. Ashanti is credited on the song due to "Baby" heavily sampling her song "Rock wit U (Awww Baby)", from the album Chapter II (2003).

Charts

Year-end charts

Certifications

References

2022 singles
2022 songs
Aitch (rapper) songs
Ashanti (singer) songs
Capitol Records singles
Songs written by Fred Again
Songs written by Ashanti (singer)
Songs written by Irv Gotti
Songs written by Chink Santana
Song recordings produced by Fred Again